Pete Sampras was the defending champion, but did not participate this year.

Marc Rosset won the tournament, beating Jim Courier 6–4, 7–6(7–2) in the final.

Seeds

Draw

Finals

Top half

Bottom half

References

Main Draw

1994 ATP Tour